Violantha is a 1928 German-Swiss silent film directed by Carl Froelich and starring  Henny Porten, Mathilde Sussin and William Dieterle. The film is set in Switzerland and is based on a novel by Ernst Zahn. In 1942 it was remade by Paul May as a sound film under the slightly different title of Violanta.

The film's art direction was by Franz Schroedter. It was shot at the Halensee Studios in Berlin and on location in Switzerland.

Cast
   Mathilde Sussin as Die alte Frau Renner  
 William Dieterle as Adelrich - ihr erster Sohn  
 Alexander Sascha as Marianus - ihr zweiter Sohn  
 Henny Porten as Violantha Zureich  
 Karl Platen as Jeremias Zureich / Kneipenwirt / ihr Onkel  
 Elsa Wagner as Seine Frau  
 Gerd Fricke as Xaver - sein Sohn  
 Wilhelm Diegelmann as Hofer, Gastwirt  
 Sophie Pagay as seine Frau  
 Blandine Ebinger as Bella - Kellnerin bei Zureich  
 Inge Landgut as Fini  
 Max Maximilian as Ein Viehhändler

References

Bibliography
 James Robert Parish & Kingsley Canham. Film Directors Guide: Western Europe. Scarecrow Press, 1976.

External links

1928 films
Films of the Weimar Republic
Films directed by Carl Froelich
German silent feature films
Swiss silent films
Films based on Swiss novels
Films set in Switzerland
Films shot in Switzerland
Films set in the Alps
UFA GmbH films
German black-and-white films
Films shot at Halensee Studios